Salter is an English occupational surname, meaning a seller of salt. Its other meaning is connected to psalter.

Notable people with this name
 Ada Salter (1866–1942), British activist and politician
 Adam Salter (died 2009), Australian man killed in a shooting incident
 Albert Salter (1816–1874), Canadian surveyor
 Alfred Salter (1873–1945), British physician and politician
 Andrew Salter (psychologist) (1914–1996), American psychotherapist
 Andrew Salter (cricketer) (born 1993), Welsh cricketer
 Anna Salter, American psychologist and novelist
 Arthur Salter (judge) (1859–1928), British politician and judge
 Arthur Salter, 1st Baron Salter (1881–1975), British politician and academic
 Ben Salter (born 1977), Australian musician
 Bryant Salter (born 1950), American football player
 David Salter, English actor and theatre director
 David Ian Salter (born 1966), American film editor
 Deborah Klimburg-Salter, Austrian art historian
 Edward Salter, 17th century, English politician
 Ernest James Salter (1897–1959), Canadian airforce pilot
 Fannie Salter (1883–1966), American lighthouse keeper
 George Salter (1897–1967), American designer
 George Salter (cricketer) (1834–1911), UK cricketer
 Hans J. Salter (1896–1994), American film composer
 Harry Salter (1899–1984), American music director
 Herbert Salter (1839–1894), English cricketer
 Herbert Edward Salter (1863–1951), English historian and clergyman
 Ivor Salter (1925–1991), English actor
 Jake Clarke-Salter (born 1997), English football player
 James Salter (1925–2015), American writer
 James Arthur Salter (1881–1975), British politician and academic
 James Salter (swimmer) (born 1976), British freestyle swimmer
 Jan Salter (1936–2018), English artist and animal welfare worker
 Jo Salter (born 1968), English airforce pilot
 Jocelyn Salter (1901–1989), British navy officer
 Joe R. Salter (born 1943), American civil servant and politician
 Jock Salter (1898–1982), British football professional
 John Salter (born 1985), American mixed martial artist
 John Henry Salter (1862–1942), English botanist and ornithologist
 John W. Salter (1852–1927), American farmer and politician
 John William Salter (1820–1869), English naturalist and paleontologist
 Joseph Salter (1816–1901), Canadian businessman and politician
 June Salter (1932–2001), Australian actress
 Justin Salter (born 1984), American musician and record producer
 Leionne Salter (1892–1972), American proponent of early 20th century revival movement
 Lewis Salter (1926–1989), American physicist
 Liam Salter (born 1993), English professional rugby league footballer
 Malachy Salter (1715–1781), English merchant and official in the New World
 Malcolm Salter (1887–1973), English cricketer
 Mary Elizabeth Turner Salter (1856–1938), American soprano and composer
 Mandy Salter fictional character in the BBC soap opera EastEnders
 Mark Salter (born	1955), American speechwriter
 Mark Salter (born 1980), English footballer
 Martin Salter (born 1954), UK member of parliament
 Mary Jo Salter (born 1954), American poet
 Matt Salter (born 1976), English rugby player
 Melville J. Salter (1834–1896), American politician
 Michael Salter (born 1967), U.S. contemporary artist
 Nick Salter (born 1987), Australian football player
 Richard Salter (disambiguation), several people, including
Richard Salter (artist) (born 1979), British artist known for his military paintings
Richard Salter (inventor), made the first spring balances in Britain
Richard Salter (singer) (1943–2009), English baritone
Richard Salter (writer), British writer who wrote Doctor Who stories including Short Trips: The Ghosts of Christmas
 Robert B. Salter (1924–2010), Canadian pediatric orthopedic surgeon
 Robert M. Salter (1920–2011), American engineer
 Roberta Semple Salter (1910–2007), American radio personality
 Sam Salter (born 1975), American musician and song writer
 Stephen Salter (born 1938), Emeritus Professor of Engineering Design and inventor of the Salter duck
 Stephen Salter (architect) (1862–1956), notable architect of Oxford, Maidenhead, and the Isle of Wight
 Stephen Salter (politician) (1938–2006), Australian politician
 Susanna M. Salter (1860–1961), American politician, first woman mayor in the United States
 Tawgs Salter (active since 2006), Canadian song writer
 Terence Macleane Salter (1883–1969), British/South African botanist
 Thomas Salter, official name of Tawgs Salter
 Timothy Salter (born 1942), English composer, conductor and pianist
 Torrey Salter (born 1988), American musician and song writer
 William Salter (disambiguation), several people, including:
 William Sawtrey (died 1401), also known as William Salter
 William Salter (MP) (died 1404), English politician
 William Salter (artist) (1804–1875), English artist
 William Salter (minister) (1821–1910), Congregational minister in Iowa, USA
 William Mackintire Salter (1853–1931), philosopher and lecturer for the Ethical Culture Society, Chicago, Illinois, USA

References

See also
Solter

English-language surnames
Occupational surnames
English-language occupational surnames